The German Class 87 was a standard (see Einheitsdampflokomotive) goods train tank locomotive with the Deutsche Reichsbahn-Gesellschaft (DRG). It was specifically designed by the firm of Orenstein & Koppel for use in Hamburg Harbour. The harbour lines had minimal curve radii of only  and high train loads to be moved. These requirements resulted in an axle count of five axles. In order to keep wear and tear on the running gear within acceptable limits only the middle three wheelsets were linked by coupling rods, the two Luttermöller outside axles were driven by cogs.

Due to damage the vehicles were partly also operated as 1′D, D1′ or 1′C1′ engines.

From 1951 they were superseded by DB Class 82 locomotives.

See also
 List of DRG locomotives and railbuses

References

87
0-10-0T locomotives
87
Railway locomotives introduced in 1927
Standard gauge locomotives of Germany
E h2t locomotives
Freight locomotives